The Bréguet 470 Fulgur was a French airliner of the 1930s. Only a single example of the twin-engined monoplane was built, this being sold to the Spanish Republican government during the Spanish Civil War.

Development and design
In the early 1930s, the French company Breguet Aviation started design of a twin-engined transport aircraft, sharing the wing design with the Breguet 460 military multi-purpose aircraft, and the Breguet 462 bomber. A mockup of the initial design, designated Breguet 46T, was displayed at the 1934 Paris Air Show. The new design, named Fulgur, and redesignated Breguet 470 T12 before the prototype was completed, was a low-winged monoplane of all-metal construction, accommodating 12 passengers. It had a retractable tailwheel undercarriage and was powered by two Gnome-Rhône 14K radial engines.

Operational history
The prototype Breguet 470 was entered in the 1936 Paris–Saigon–Paris race, with the hope of winning a large cash prize (1,800,000 Francs), and a promise that the winner would be purchased by the French Air Ministry. The 470 departed Paris on 25 October, reaching India before dropping out due to mechanical problems. It was re-engined with more powerful, 937 hp (699 kW) Gnome-Rhône 14N radials in 1937 before being entered in that year's Istres–Damascus–Paris race, finishing fifth in a time of 21:03 hours, with demilitarised Savoia-Marchetti SM.79s bombers occupying the first three places and a de Havilland Comet racer finishing fourth.

No further production followed, and the prototype was sold to the Spanish Republican government at the time of the Spanish Civil War. It was painted dark green, but the paint peeled in many places, giving the plane a scruffy look. The aircraft was used mainly for LAPE flights between Barcelona and Toulouse, although the Spanish Republican Air Force occasionally used it as a military transport as well. It escaped to France following the surrender of the Spanish Republican Armed Forces. The aircraft then was scrapped.

Operators

LAPE (Líneas Aéreas Postales Españolas)

Specifications

See also

Notes

References

"The Exhibits Described:Large Civil Machines". Flight, 22 November 1934. p. 1238
"Marseilles–Damascus-Paris". Flight 26 August 1937, pp. 204–207
"Paris–Saigon–Perhaps". Flight 29 October 1936, p. 445
"Plane Facts: The Unique Fulgur". Air International, June 1984, Vol. 26, No. 5. ISSN 0306-5634. pp. 306–307

External links

Aviafrance
Breguet 470 - Airwar

1930s French airliners
 0470
Low-wing aircraft
Aircraft first flown in 1936
Twin piston-engined tractor aircraft